Jim Lynch (born 16 March 1948) is an Australian speed skater. He competed in two events at the 1972 Winter Olympics. Lynch became part of the Sports Australia Hall of Fame in 1991.

References

External links
 

1948 births
Living people
Australian male speed skaters
Olympic speed skaters of Australia
Speed skaters at the 1972 Winter Olympics
Sportspeople from Sydney
Sport Australia Hall of Fame inductees